Aérospatiale, sometimes styled Aerospatiale, was a French state-owned aerospace manufacturer that built both civilian and military aircraft, rockets and satellites. It was originally known as Société nationale industrielle aérospatiale (SNIAS). Its head office was in the 16th arrondissement of Paris. The name was changed to Aérospatiale during 1970.

During the 1990s, Aérospatiale underwent several significant restructures and mergers. Its helicopter division was, along with Germany's DaimlerBenz Aerospace AG (DASA), combined to form the Eurocopter Group. In 1999, the majority of Aérospatiale, except for its satellite activities, merged with French conglomerate Matra's defense wing, Matra Haute Technologie, to form Aérospatiale-Matra. That same year, the satellite manufacturing division merged with Alcatel to become Alcatel Space, now Thales Alenia Space. In 2001, Aérospatiale-Matra merged with Spanish aviation company Construcciones Aeronáuticas SA (CASA) and German defense firm DaimlerChrysler Aerospace AG (DASA) to form the multinational European Aeronautic Defence and Space Company (EADS). Currently, the majority of the former assets of the company are part of the multinational Airbus consortium.

History

Formation

During 1970, Aérospatiale was created under the name SNIAS as a result of the merger of several French state-owned companies - Sud Aviation, Nord Aviation and Société d'étude et de réalisation d'engins balistiques (SEREB). The newly formed entity was the largest aerospace company in France. From the onset, the French government owned a controlling stake in Aérospatiale; at one stage, a 97 per cent ownership of the company was held by the government.

In 1971, Aérospatiale was managed by the French industrialist Henri Ziegler; that same year, the firm's North American marketing and sales arm, which had previously operated under the trading name of the French Aerospace Corporation, was officially rebranded as the European Aerospace Corporation, which was intended to better reflect Aérospatiale's increasing focus on collaborative efforts with its European partners.

Major activities
Many of Aérospatiale's initial programmes were holdovers from its predecessors, particularly those of Sud Aviation. Perhaps the most high-profile of these programmes was Concorde, a joint French-British attempt to develop and market a supersonic commercial airliner. Initial work on this project had begun at Sud Aviation and the Bristol Aeroplane Company, its British counterpart. The engines for Concorde were also developed as a joint Anglo-French effort between SNECMA and Bristol Siddeley. However, the programme was highly politicised and encountered considerable cost overruns and delays. Ultimately, it was negatively affected equally by bad political decisions and an oil crisis in the 1970s; thus, only two airlines purchased Concorde.

Aérospatiale's senior management were keen to avoid the mistakes of the  Concorde program. Their next major effort was would be an international consortium between British Aerospace and West German's aircraft company Messerschmitt-Bolkow-Blohm (MBB), called Airbus Industries.

This was established with the purpose of building a twin-engined widebody airliner, known as the A300. While at first, it was difficult to achieve sales and the outlook for the A300 seemed negative. However, Aérospatiale continued to manufacture the airliner without orders, as it could not reasonably cut back production as French law required that laid-off employees were to receive 90 percent of their pay for a year as well as to retain their health benefits throughout.

Sales of the A300 picked up and the type eventually became a major commercial success, subsequently driving both the American Lockheed L-1011 and the McDonnell Douglas DC-10 from the market due to its cheaper operating model. On the back of this success, further airliners would be produced under the Airbus brand and the company would become a world leader in the field of large commercial aircraft during the 1990s.

Aérospatiale played a leading role in the development of the European space sector. During the 1960s, Sud Aviation had been involved in a multinational European programme to produce the Europa space launch vehicle, this being a three-stage rocket with 
the separate stages being manufactured in Britain, France, and Germany respectively. However, all of the flight tests conducted were failures; the programme's misfortune has been attributed to there being no central authority responsible for operations. This came was a result of the issue of workshare becoming highly politicized.

When Aérospatiale stepped in, during 1973, it was determined not to repeat the mistakes of Europa. The company proposed to build a new heavy launch vehicle, which would later be called the Ariane, to take the place of Europa. While other European nations were invited to participate, it would be French officials who would hold primary responsibility, and thus, make the most important decisions. This approach was agreed upon with several other nations; during 1979.

Ariane was an immediate success, allowing the French to gain a strong advantage over the United States, which had centred its efforts on the Space Shuttle. However, the Challenger disaster during 1986 showed that it was too complex for routine use as a satellite launch platform. Aérospatiale went on to develop more capable versions of the Ariane, which took much of the business of space launches away from the Americans during the 1990s.

Privatisation and mergers
In 1992, German defense company DaimlerBenz Aerospace AG (DASA) and Aérospatiale combined their respective helicopter divisions together to form the Eurocopter Group; ownership of this new entity was shared between the two parent companies.

During the late 1990s, French Prime Minister Lionel Jospin's Plural Left government initiated a policy towards the privatization of Aérospatiale. In 1999, the majority of Aérospatiale, except for the satellites activities, merged with French conglomerate Matra's defense wing, Matra Haute Technologie, to form Aérospatiale-Matra. During 2001, Aérospatiale-Matra's missile division underwent a further merger with Anglo-French outfit Matra BAe Dynamics and the missile division of Alenia Marconi Systems to form the multinational MBDA entity.

On 10 July 2000, Aérospatiale-Matra merged with Spanish aviation company Construcciones Aeronáuticas SA (CASA) and German defense firm DaimlerChrysler Aerospace AG (DASA) to form the multinational European Aeronautic Defence and Space Company (EADS). EADS would later rebrand itself as Airbus Military, taking the name of its commercial aircraft division, its primary business.

Products

Fixed-wing aircraft
 CM.170 Magister 
 CM.175 Zephyr
 Concorde (with British Aircraft Corporation) 
 N.262
 N.500
 SE 210 Caravelle
 SN 601 Corvette 
 TB 30 Epsilon
 Ludion

Helicopters

 AS 332 Super Puma
 AS 350 Ecureuil/AStar 
 AS 355 Ecureuil 2/TwinStar
 AS 532 Cougar
 AS 550 Fennec
 AS 565 Panther
 SA 313/SA 318 Alouette II
 SA 315B Lama
 SA 316/SA 319 Alouette III 
 SA 321 Super Frelon 
 SA 330 Puma 
 SA 341/SA 342 Gazelle
 SA 360 Dauphin
 SA 365/AS365 Dauphin 2
 HH-65 Dolphin

Unmanned aerial vehicles
 C.22

Missiles

 AS 15 TT
 AS-20
 AS-30
 M1 (missile)
 M20 (missile)
 M45 (missile)
 S1 (missile)
 S2 (missile)
 S3 (missile)
 SS.11
 SS.12/AS.12
 Air-Sol Moyenne Portée
 ENTAC
 Exocet
 Hadès (missile)
 HOT (missile)
 MILAN
 Pluton (missile)
 Roland (missile)

Space-related products

 AMC-5 (satellite)
 Arabsat (satellite)
 Arabsat-1A
 Arabsat-1B
 Ariane rocket
 Ariane 1
 Ariane 2
 Ariane 3
 Ariane 4
 Ariane 5
 Astra 5A (satellite)
 Atmospheric Reentry Demonstrator
 Diamant (rocket)
 Hermes spaceplane (not built)
 Huygens (spacecraft)
 Infrared Space Observatory
 INSAT-1C (satellite)
 INSAT-2DT (satellite)
 Meteosat (satellite)
 Nahuel 1A (satellite)
 Proteus (satellite)
 Spacebus (satellite)
 Symphonie (satellite) (satellite)
 Tele-X (satellite)
 Turksat (satellite)
 Turksat 1A
 Turksat 1B
 Turksat 1C
 Topaze (sounding rocket)
 TV-SAT 1 (satellite)

List of CEOs 
 1970-1973 : Henri Ziegler
 1973-1975 : Charles Cristofini
 1975-1983 : général Jacques Mitterrand, the brother of François Mitterrand
 Henri Martre (1983 - 1992)
 Louis Gallois (1992 - 1996)

See also 
 Construcciones Aeronáuticas SA

References

Citations

Bibliography

External links

 Helis.com

 
Aerospace companies of France
Aircraft manufacturers of France
Manufacturing companies established in 1970
Helicopter manufacturers of France
French brands
Privatized companies of France
1999 mergers and acquisitions
Manufacturing companies disestablished in 1999
French companies disestablished in 1999
French companies established in 1970